Au bord d'une source ("Beside a Spring") is a piano piece by Franz Liszt; it is the 4th piece of the first suite of Années de Pèlerinage ("Years of Pilgrimage").

There are three separate versions of Au bord d'une source. The first version appears in Liszt's set Album d'un voyageur (1834–1838), and the second in the first suite of Liszt's Années de pèlerinage (1836–1855). The last version is almost identical to the second, except for the final nine bars, which were added by Liszt as a coda for his Italian piano student Giovanni Sgambati, who was also a composer; this lengthened the piece by about 30 seconds. The coda was written in 1863.

The second version of Au bord d'une source is often regarded as the most popular. In the first version the technical difficulties are considerably higher to the pianist, whilst the last version adds a flashy coda.

Analysis

The main theme of Au bord d’une source comprises a pattern of arpeggiated semiquavers in the right hand with short notes in the left, firstly played below the right hand and then played two octaves higher, above the right hand. This constant crossing over of hands places considerable technical demands on the amateur pianist.

Liszt links the various sections of the piece together using passages of intricate scale and arpeggio patterns ascending high into the upper register, descending back down and transforming back into the melody; this allows the whole piece to flow as one.

The piece has many intricate difficulties that are belied by the calm mood with which a successful performance is often imbued.

Recordings

The following pianists have recorded the piece, among others:

{| class="wikitable"
! Pianist
! Duration
! Record Label
! Recording Date
! Album
|-
|Vladimir Horowitz
|03:31
|Philips Records
|1947
|Vladimir Horowitz II
|-
|Vladimir Horowitz
|04:12
|RCA Victor Red Seal
|1975
|Horowitz Rediscovered /Carnegie Hall Recital 1975
|-
|Wilhelm Kempff
|04:03
|Decca
|1950s
|Franz Liszt: Années de pelèrinage / Deux Légendes
|-
|Sviatoslav Richter
|03:07
|Parnassus
|1958
|Sviatoslav Richter in the 1950s, Vol. 3
|-
|Jorge Bolet
|03:59
|Philips Records
|1983
|Jorge Bolet II
|-
|Claudio Arrau
|04:08
|Pearl
|1928
|The Early Recordings
|-
|Eugen d'Albert
|03:33
|Pearl
|1916
|The Pupils of Liszt
|-
|Jenő Jandó
|03:50
|Naxos Records
|1991
|Liszt: Années de Pèlerinage I (Switzerland)
|-
|Leslie Howard
|04:56
|Hyperion Records
|1996
|Liszt: Deuxième Année de Pèlerinage - Italie/Venezia e Napoli
|-
|Tony MacAlpine
|03:18
|Shrapnel Records
|1999
|Master of Paradise
|-
|Lazar Berman
|03:33
|Deutsche Grammophon (DG)
|1977
|Liszt: Années de Pèlerinage
|}

References

External links
Album d'un Voyageur, S.156 Scores at the IMSLP.  
Années de Pèlerinage: 1ère Année: Suisse, S.160 Scores at the IMSLP.
[ Au bord d'une source] at Allmusic
Au bord d'une source played by Vladimir Horowitz, from The Last Romantic (YouTube)

Compositions by Franz Liszt
Compositions for solo piano
1855 compositions
Piano compositions in the Romantic era